Paul Michael Weir (born June 12, 1979) is the athletic director at Eastern New Mexico University. He is the former head men's basketball coach of the University of New Mexico, having been named head coach on April 11, 2017 as the successor to Craig Neal, his second head coaching position at the college level. Weir was also the head coach of New Mexico State University (NMSU) for one season, going 28–6 and winning the Western Athletic Conference tournament. He was an assistant at NMSU from 2007 to 2016, including five seasons as associate head coach. Prior to that he spent two years as an assistant coach under Steve Alford at the University of Iowa, and served as director of basketball operations at Northwestern State University for one season. Weir began his coaching career as head coach of Don Bosco Catholic Secondary School in Toronto from 1999 to 2003. He also served as an assistant coach for the Costa Rica national basketball team in 2015.

Weir grew up in Toronto, Canada and graduated from Iona Catholic Secondary School while earning all regional and city honors playing point guard for the basketball team. He earned a bachelor's degree from York University in Toronto in 2004. He earned a master's degree in health and human performance from Northwestern State in 2005, added a second master's degree in sports psychology from Iowa in 2010, and a third master's degree in business administration from New Mexico State in 2012. He is currently enrolled in the Educational Leadership Doctoral Program at NMSU.

Weir is one of four Canadian-born NCAA Division I men's basketball head coaches all-time, joining James Naismith, Pete Newell, and Maurice Joseph.

He is the head coach of Canada U-19 team replacing NBA assistant coach Roy Rana.

Head coaching record

References

External links
 New Mexico profile
 New Mexico State profile

1979 births
Living people
Canadian men's basketball coaches
College men's basketball head coaches in the United States
Iowa Hawkeyes men's basketball coaches
New Mexico Lobos men's basketball coaches
New Mexico State Aggies men's basketball coaches
New Mexico State University alumni
Northwestern State Demons basketball coaches
Northwestern State University alumni
Point guards
Basketball players from Toronto
University of Iowa alumni
York Lions players